Jengo Stevens is a Sierra Leonean politician. He is the son of Siaka Stevens, who was President of Sierra Leone from 1971 to 1985, and he was a Member of Parliament representing Kambia District. He is a member of the ruling All People's Congress (APC).

External links
 Sierra Leone: 'Kabbah Aided SLPMB's Destruction,' Says Dr. Jengo Stevens

Year of birth missing (living people)
Place of birth missing (living people)
Living people
Sierra Leonean diplomats
Members of the Parliament of Sierra Leone
All People's Congress politicians